Weber La Segunda Ladies Power Team (UCI code SLP) is a professional women's cycling team, based in Argentina, which competed in elite road bicycle racing events such as the UCI Women's Road World Cup. In 2018 the team dropped from UCI status down to National level.

Major wins
2016
 Youth classification Tour Femenino de San Luis, Aranza Valentina Villalon Sánchez

2017
1st Overall Tour Internacional Femenino de Uruguay, Marlies Mejías Garcia
1st Stages 1, 2 & 4, Marlies Mejías Garcia
1st Overall Vuelta Femenina a San Juan, Marlies Mejías Garcia
1st Stages 1, 2, 3 (ITT) & 4, Marlies Mejías Garcia
1st Wilmington Grand Prix, Marlies Mejías Garcia
1st Overall The Armed Forces Cycling Classic, Marlies Mejías Garcia
1st Stage 1, Marlies Mejías Garcia
1st Stages 4 & 6 North Star Grand Prix, Marlies Mejías Garcia
1st Stage 9 Tour of America's Dairyland, Marlies Mejías Garcia
1st Overall Intelligentsia Cup, Marlies Mejías Garcia
1st Stages 1, 2, 6, 7, 9 & 10, Marlies Mejías Garcia
1st Overall Vuelta Antioquia Femenina, Rocio Parrado Guarnizo

2018
Overall Gran Premio Ciudad de Rio Tercero, Maribel Aguirre
Stages 1 & 2, Maribel Aguirre
Gran Premio Campagnolo, Mariela Analia Delgado
Stage 2 Clasica Esteban Chaves, Jessenia Meneses
Stage 1 Johnson City Omnium, Rocio Parrado

Regional & National champions
2016
 Chile Time Trial, Aranza Valentina Villalon Sánchez

2017
 Argentina Junior Time Trial, Maribel Aguirre
 Chile Time Trial, Aranza Valentina Villalon Sánchez
 Juegos Bolivarianos Time Trial, Aranza Valentina Villalon Sánchez
 Juegos Bolivarianos Track (Team pursuit), Camila Valbuena

2018
 Argentina Road Race, Maribel Aguirre

2019
 Argentina Track (Individual pursuit), Antonella Leonardi

2021
 Argentina Junior Time Trial, Eliana Tocha
 Argentina Junior Road Race, Eliana Tocha
 Argentina Road Race, Maria Fadiga

Team roster

References

UCI Women's Teams
Cycling teams established in 2015
Cycling teams based in Argentina